The Videsha Seva Padakkama (VSP, Foreign Service Medal) (Sinhala: විදේශ සේවා පදක්කම vidēsha sevā padakkama) is awarded for:

Recipients of the medal can use the post-nominal letters "VSP".

References

External links
Sri Lanka Army
Sri Lanka Navy
Sri Lanka Air Force
Ministry of Defence : Sri Lanka

Military awards and decorations of Sri Lanka
Awards established in 1981